Robinson Guevara (born October 17, 1994) is an Ecuadorian footballer who plays as a defender for Trofense.

References

External links

1994 births
Living people
Association football defenders
Ecuadorian footballers
C.D. Trofense players
Ecuadorian expatriate footballers
Expatriate footballers in Portugal